Theo Maia Marques de Oliveira (born 29 January 1998) is a Brazilian professional footballer.

References

External links 
 
 

1998 births
Living people
Brazilian footballers
Brazilian expatriate footballers
Association football midfielders
Audax Rio de Janeiro Esporte Clube players
Fluminense FC players
CR Flamengo footballers
FC Isloch Minsk Raion players
Belarusian Premier League players
Brazilian expatriate sportspeople in Belarus
Expatriate footballers in Belarus
Footballers from Rio de Janeiro (city)